Man Uk Pin is a Hakka walled village in Sha Tau Kok, North District, Hong Kong.

Administration
Man Uk Pin is a recognized village under the New Territories Small House Policy. It is one of the villages represented within the Sha Tau Kok District Rural Committee. For electoral purposes, Man Uk Pin is part of the Sha Ta constituency, which is currently represented by Ko Wai-kei.

Geography
Man Uk Pin is located in the north-eastern New Territories of Hong Kong, on the north-western side of Sha Tau Kok Road, close to Wo Hang.

History
According to the 1688 Gazetteer of Xin'an County, only two villages were established in the modern day Sha Tau Kok area: Ma Tseuk Leng and Man Uk Pin. Both were small agricultural settlements. Wo Hang, although existing, was not recognized.

Man Uk Pin was recorded as a Hakka village in the 1819 Gazetteer of Xin'an County. It was first settled in the late 17th century by the Man who came from Wuhua in Guangdong province. The Man later moved out of the village and stayed in Heung Yuen, Ping Che and Tong Fong nearby. The village was later settled by the Chung and the Fu in the 18th century and later by the Tong, the Law, the Chan and others. The Tong came to the village around the 19th century from Pingshan in Guangdong.

Features
Out of the eight ancestral halls that were built in the village, four are still standing today. One of them, the Tong Ancestral Hall, has been listed as a Grade III historic building.

See also
 Walled villages of Hong Kong

References

External links

 Delineation of area of existing village Man Uk Pin (Sha Tau Kok) for election of resident representative (2019 to 2022)
 Pictures of Tong Ancestral Hall, No. 18 Man Uk Pin

Walled villages of Hong Kong
Sha Tau Kok
Villages in North District, Hong Kong